In the early 21st century, several political parties were founded that have as their main goal the improvement of animal welfare and the recognition of animal rights:

See also 
 List of animal rights advocates
 List of animal rights groups
 American Vegetarian Party

References

External links 
 Party for the Animals, "Animal parties worldwide"
 Dutch Party for the Animals, List of Animal Parties in the world (older list)

 
Animal welfare